The Bishop of Sabah is an Anglican prelate who oversees the Diocese of Sabah in the Church of the Province of South East Asia. Following the death of Albert Vun Cheong Fui on 14 July 2014, Melter Tais was installed as the sixth bishop on 14 May 2015. His seat is All Saints' Cathedral, Kota Kinabalu.

History

Anglican worship in the territory administered by the diocese today began as early as 1846 when the Lieutenant Governor of Labuan, John Scott, was given authority by the Bishop of London to perform burials and weddings using the 1662 Book of Common Prayer.

The Revd Dr Francis McDougall was one of the first group of Anglican missionaries to arrive on the island of Borneo in 1847. He laboured in the ministry from his base in Kuching. In 1855, McDougall  was consecrated in Calcutta as the Bishop of Labuan and its Dependencies. Bishop McDougall continued to operate, however, from Kuching, the title of his bishopric being due to the then Church of England’s practice of only setting up a diocese in a Crown possession, which Labuan was, while the Kingdom of Sarawak under Rajah James Brooke was not.

The first church in the present-day diocese, the Church of Our Holy Saviour, Labuan was built and consecrated by the bishop on 18 December 1866.

The diocese then included Anglican churches in the Labuan, North Borneo, and Sarawak. With the transfer of jurisdiction of the Anglican churches in the Straits Settlements from the Diocese of Calcutta to the diocese, it was renamed the Diocese of Labuan, Sarawak and Singapore in 1869. In 1909, the Straits Settlements was separated from to form its own diocese and the diocese was renamed the Diocese of Labuan and Sarawak. In 1949, the diocese was again renamed the Diocese of Borneo.

In 1962, the diocese was divided into the Diocese of Jesselton and the Diocese of Kuching. The Diocese of Jesselton was renamed the Diocese of Sabah in 1968 after the renaming of the Jesselton to Kota Kinabalu and to reflect the new political situation after the formation of Malaysia.

In 2015, the first native Sabahan of the Kadazan people, Melter Tais, was consecrated the Bishop of Sabah.

List of bishops

Yong Chen Fah (younger brother to Ping Chung) was made Assistant Bishop in 1998 and seconded to the Anglican Diocese of Sydney in 2007.

See also 
Diocese of Sabah
Church of the Province of South East Asia
Diocese of Kuching
Diocese of West Malaysia
Diocese of Singapore
Anglicanism
Anglican Communion

References 

Sabah, Bishop of
Sabah, Bishop of
Anglicanism in Malaysia
Anglicanism in Singapore
1855 establishments in Sabah
1850s establishments in British Malaya